The 2014 Colorado Ice season was the team's eighth season as a professional indoor football franchise and sixth in the Indoor Football League (IFL). One of nine teams that competed in the IFL for the 2014 season, the Fort Collins-based Colorado Ice were members of the Intense Conference.

Founded in 2007 as part of United Indoor Football, the Colorado Ice became charter members of the IFL when the UIF merged with the Intense Football League before the 2009 season. In their third season under head coach Heron O'Neal, the team played their home games at the Budweiser Events Center in Loveland, Colorado.

The Colorado Icicles dance team is led by director Rehannon Crumb.

Roster moves
The team invited 40 players to training camp starting February 5. After workouts and a pre-season exhibition game, the roster was trimmed to the 24 players permitted under IFL rules.

Awards and honors
On March 5, 2014, the IFL announced its Week 2 Players of the Week. Colorado Ice wide receiver Jasonus Tillery received an Honorable Mention for offense. Linebacker Joe Thornton received an Honorable Mention for defense. On March 12, 2014, the IFL announced its Week 3 Players of the Week. Colorado Ice kicker Philip Welch was named as the Special Teams Player of the Week. Wide receiver Kyle Kaiser received an Honorable Mention for offense. Defensive lineman Harcourt Farquharson and linebacker Joe Thornton each received an Honorable Mention for defense.

On April 2, 2014, the IFL announced its Week 6 Players of the Week. Colorado Ice running back Dennis Kennedy was named as the Offensive Player of the Week. On April 9, 2014, the IFL announced its Week 7 Players of the Week. Colorado Ice quarterback Willie Copeland was named as the Offensive Player of the Week. Defensive back Harcourt Farquharson and defensive lineman Jason Jones each received an Honorable Mention for defense. Linebacker Joe Thornton received his third Honorable Mention of the season, his first for special teams play. 

On April 16, 2014, the IFL announced its Week 8 Players of the Week. Colorado Ice defensive back Corey Sample was named as the Defensive Player of the Week. Kick returner Harcourt Farquharson and kicker Philip Welch each received an Honorable Mention for special teams play. On April 23, 2014, the IFL announced its Week 9 Players of the Week. Colorado Ice defensive lineman Jason Jones was named as the Defensive Player of the Week. Quarterback Willie Copeland received an Honorable Mention for offense. Linebacker Joe Thornton received an Honorable Mention for defense.

Schedule
Key:

Preseason

Regular season
All start times are Mountain Time

Postseason

Roster

Standings

References

External links
Colorado Ice official statistics
Colorado Ice at Loveland Reporter-Herald
Colorado Ice at Fort Collins Coloradoan

Colorado Ice
Colorado Crush (IFL)
Colorado Ice